The Phil G. McDonald Memorial Bridge, also known as the Glade Creek Bridge, is a deck truss bridge located in Raleigh County, West Virginia near the city of Beckley. The bridge is also among the top hundred highest bridges in the world.

The bridge is named after West Virginia native Phill G. McDonald (the official bridge name is missing the second 'L') who was a United States Army soldier and a recipient of the United States military's highest decoration—the Medal of Honor—for his actions in the Vietnam War. The completion of the bridge was the final part of I-64 to be built in West Virginia with Governor Arch Moore opening the bridge at a ribbon-cutting ceremony on 15 July 1988.

References

Road bridges in West Virginia
Truss bridges in the United States
Buildings and structures in Raleigh County, West Virginia